N'Togonasso is a small town and seat of the commune of Gouadji Kao in the Cercle of Koutiala in the Sikasso Region of southern Mali. The town is 42 km northeast of Koutiala.

References

Populated places in Sikasso Region